Grüsch railway station is a railway station in the municipality of Grüsch, in the Swiss canton of Grisons. It is an intermediate stop on the Rhaetian Railway  Landquart–Davos Platz line.

Services
Grüsch is served by regional trains and the S1 of the Chur S-Bahn:

 RegioExpress: hourly service between Landquart and Davos Platz.
 Regio:
 Limited service to Scuol-Tarasp.
 Limited service between Landquart and Davos Platz.
 Chur S-Bahn : hourly service between Rhäzüns and Schiers.

References

External links
 
 

Grüsch
Railway stations in Graubünden
Rhaetian Railway stations
Railway stations in Switzerland opened in 1889